Macra may refer to:
 Macra, a place in the Province of Cuneo in north-west Italy
 Macra na Feirme, an Irish youth organisation
 the Latin name for the Magra, a river in Liguria and Tuscany in north-Italy
 an acronym for the Medicare Access and CHIP Reauthorization Act of 2015 in the United States.
 the Latin name for the Maira, an Italian river which runs through the province of Cuneo in eastern Piedmont
 Malawi Communications Regulatory Authority
 the Macra, a fictional race of Monsters in Doctor Who
 plural form of macron, a diacritic